The 1931 Star Riders' Championship was the third edition of the speedway Star Riders' Championship. The competition was decided on a knockout basis over nine heats.

Final 
18 September 1931
 Wembley, England

Heat details
Heat 1 : Watson, Tauser, Shepherd, Bishop
Heat 2 : Parker, Rickman, Jackson, Stewart
Heat 3 : Warwick, Edmonds (Fell), Hastings (Fell), Wilkinson (Ret)
Heat 4 : Croombs, Huxley, Kendrick, Strecker
Heat 5 : Arthur, Spinks, Patrick, Johnson

Semi-final 1 : Huxley, Rickman, Watson
Semi-final 2 : Tauser, Arthur
Semi-final 3 : Parker, Croombs

Final : Tauser, Huxley, Croombs, Parker (Exc)

References

1931
Speedway
Star Riders' Championship